Castillo de Salas was a Spanish bulk carrier that was launched in Ferrol on 20 December 1979 and completed in August 1980. It required a crew complement of 32.

Wreck and salvage
The ship was anchored outside Gijón's seaport (El Musel) when the ship's anchor came loose in bad weather. Efforts to re-anchor, self-propel and even tow the ship away from the coast failed due to harsh seas. On 15 January 1986 the hull broke in two during efforts to bring the ship afloat, therefore releasing a spill of diesel oil and coal ore.

Officials stated that no diesel oil was left in the bow section of the hull. During the following spring, the company Fondomar was tasked with salvaging the remainder of the stern portion of the hull.

Second salvage of the stern section
Small balls of decomposed oil were found sporadically since until 2001, when a major find of these balls was confirmed to be from fuel remaining in the double bottom fuel tank of the stern section that was not removed in 1986. This led to a second salvage operation to remove the fuel during 2001–2002 and the complete the removal of the remainder of the wreck in 2003 due to public out-cry.

Trophies

On 15 November 2003 Gijón artist Joaquín Rubio Camín's sculpture "Memoria" (Memory) was unveiled on the Camino del Cervigón overlooking the sea.  The sculpture was made using part of the remains of Castillo de Salas which sank off Gijón and were recovered earlier in the year.

Side effects
Since the incident, it is common to find dark sand contaminated with coal on the beaches in the Bay of Gijón, particularly after rough sea conditions. The amounts recovered continue to reduce over time, but patches of dark coloured sand, high in black coal particles, can be seen at low tide.

References

Further reading
 Hundimiento del Castillo de Salas 
 Piezas del Castillo de Salas (English and Spanish)
 Interview with Joaquin Rubio Camin about his sculpture 
 Diving at the remains of Castillo de Salas

External links
 Pictures from salvage company Titan of "Castillo de Salas" in 2003

Maritime incidents in 1986
Maritime incidents in Spain
Ships built in Spain
1986 in Spain
1979 ships